Justin Brian Nicolino (born November 22, 1991) is an American professional baseball pitcher who is a free agent. He has played in Major League Baseball (MLB) for the Miami Marlins, and in the Chinese Professional Baseball League (CPBL) for the Rakuten Monkeys.

Early life and education
Nicolino attended University High School in Orlando, Florida. Playing for the school's baseball team, he had a 4–2 win–loss record and a 1.95 earned run average (ERA) with 74 strikeouts in 44 innings pitched in his senior year. He committed to attend the University of Virginia on a college baseball scholarship. Projected as a third or fourth round pick in the 2010 Major League Baseball Draft, Nicolino expected to honor the commitment.

The Toronto Blue Jays selected Nicolino in the second round of the 2010 Major League Baseball draft, with the 80th overall selection.  He signed with the Blue Jays for a reported $615,000 signing bonus, rather than enroll at the University of Virginia.

Professional career

Toronto Blue Jays

Nicolino made his professional debut for the Vancouver Canadians of the Class A-Short Season Northwest League in 2011, posting a 5–1 win–loss record and a 1.03 ERA. The Blue Jays promoted him to the Lansing Lugnuts of the Class A Midwest League late in the season, and he pitched to a 1–1 record and a 3.12 ERA in three starts for Lansing. Nicolino returned to Lansing for the 2012 season. He had a 10–4 win–loss record with a Midwest League-best 2.46 ERA and 119 strikeouts in  innings pitched. His teammates voted him as the Lugnuts' Most Valuable Player, and he was named to the Midwest League Postseason All-Star team.

Miami Marlins
On November 19, 2012, the Blue Jays traded Nicolino, Adeiny Hechavarria, Henderson Álvarez, Yunel Escobar, Jeff Mathis, Anthony DeSclafani, and Jake Marisnick to the Miami Marlins in exchange for Mark Buehrle, Josh Johnson, José Reyes, John Buck, and Emilio Bonifacio. On January 29, 2013, Nicolino was named number 72 on MLB's Top 100 Prospects list. He began the 2013 season with the Jupiter Hammerheads of the Class A-Advanced Florida State League (FSL). After pitching to a 5–2 record with a 2.23 ERA, and being named a FSL All-Star, he received a promotion to the Jacksonville Suns of the Class AA Southern League in July. Pitching for Jacksonville in 2014, Nicolino had a went 14–4 with a 2.85 ERA in 28 starts, and was named the Marlins' Minor League Pitcher of the Year. After the 2014 season, the Marlins added Nicolino to their 40-man roster to protect him from the Rule 5 draft.

Nicolino began the 2015 season with the New Orleans Zephyrs of the Class AAA Pacific Coast League. The Marlins called up Nicolino for his first major league start on June 20, 2015, taking the rotation spot of Tom Koehler. He pitched 7 shutout innings, giving up 4 hits and 2 walks, with 2 strikeouts. He was optioned back to Class AAA on June 30, 2015. He finished the season 5-4 with a 4.01 ERA in 12 starts for the Marlins. He struck out 23 in 74 innings.

In 2016, Nicolino pitched in 5 games out of the bullpen, while starting 13 for the Marlins. He finished with a 3-6 record and a 4.99 ERA on the season.

In 2017, Nicolino was placed on the disabled list on May 30 with a contusion on his left index finger. Nicolino pitched in 12 games out of the bullpen, while starting 8 for the Marlins. He finished with a 2-3 record and a 5.06 ERA on the 2017 season.

In his career with the Marlins, Nicolino, was 10-13 with a 4.65 ERA in 50 games, including 33 starts, and in spring training in 2018 with the Marlins he had a 5.23 ERA in five games.

Cincinnati Reds
On March 25, 2018, Nicolino was claimed off waivers by the Cincinnati Reds. Two days later, he was outrighted to Triple-A. He elected free agency on November 3, 2018.

Minnesota Twins
On February 6, 2019, Nicolino signed a minor league deal with the Minnesota Twins that included an invitation to spring training. He opened the 2019 season with the Rochester Red Wings. Nicolino was released by the organization on May 1, 2019.

Chicago White Sox
On May 4, 2019, Nicolino signed a minor league deal with the Chicago White Sox. He became a free agent following the 2019 season.

Rakuten Monkeys
On February 13, 2020, Nicolino signed with the Rakuten Monkeys of the Chinese Professional Baseball League. On September 9, Nicolino was released by the Monkeys. In 8 games with the team, he had recorded a 5.90 ERA in 39.2 innings pitched.

High Point Rockers
On April 21, 2022, Nicolino signed with the High Point Rockers. In 6 starts, he posted a 4–1 record with a 2.06 ERA and 29 strikeouts in 35 innings.

Cincinnati Reds (second stint)
On May 25, 2022, Nicolino's contract was purchased by the Cincinnati Reds and he was assigned to the Triple-A Louisville Bats. He elected free agency on November 10, 2022.

Scouting report
Nicolino is a contact pitcher, pitching in the high 80s to low 90s with his fastball. He also throws a changeup and a curveball. Since 2014, Nicolino has averaged 4.8 strikeouts per 9 innings in the minors, while with the Marlins since 2015, he's average 3.7 strikeouts per 9 innings.

References

External links

1991 births
Living people
American expatriate baseball players in Canada
American expatriate baseball players in Taiwan
Baseball players from Orlando, Florida
Charlotte Knights players
High Point Rockers players
Jacksonville Suns players
Jupiter Hammerheads players
Lansing Lugnuts players
Louisville Bats players
Major League Baseball pitchers
Miami Marlins players
New Orleans Baby Cakes players
New Orleans Zephyrs players
Rakuten Monkeys players
Rochester Red Wings players
Vancouver Canadians players
University High School (Orlando, Florida) alumni